Agnes Almendras Magpale (born January 21, 1942) is Filipina educator and politician from Cebu, Philippines. In 2010, she became a Cebu Provincial Board Member, acting Vice Governor, and acting Governor within a single three-year electoral term through succession. She assumed the Vice Governor post upon the death of incumbent Gregorio Sanchez, Jr. in 2010 and became acting Governor when Gwendolyn Garcia was suspended in 2012.

Previously, she was a member of the Provincial Board representing the 5th legislative district from 1992 until 2001. After taking a break from politics, she was elected again to the Provincial Board from 2004 until 2011.

Early life and education 
Magpale was born in Danao on January 21, 1942. The eldest child of Josefino Durano Almendras of Danao and Rosita de la Serna Dimataga of Lapu-Lapu City, she attended at St. Theresa's College in Cebu City. Then, she graduated with an Associate in Arts at the University of Santo Tomas in Manila in 1959, acquired a bachelor's degree in nutrition at the University of the Philippines Diliman in 1963, and a master's degree in nutrition at the Drexel University in 1965.

Additionally, she earned a Certificate in Local Administration and Development from the Department of the Interior and Local Government (DILG) and University of the Philippines, as well as Doctoral in Organizational Development and Transformation at the Cebu Doctors College.

Political career 
Magpale established her political career in her hometown of Danao and considered the local political leader, Ramon Durano III, as her mentor. In over two decades in public service, she was known for her concerns for women's and children's rights.

Vice Mayor 
At the age of 27, her political career began in 1971 when she was elected Danao Vice Mayor.

Provincial Board Member 
After she quit politics for 13 years to take care of her children, she campaigned and was voted as member of the Cebu Provincial Board representing the 5th legislative district in 1992 and having been elected with the highest number of votes, she served as Presiding Officer Pro-Tempore for three consecutive terms until 2001.

In 2001, she took a break from politics, and she worked as the President of the Northeastern Cebu Colleges for a year. President Gloria Macapagal Arroyo appointed her as member of the Movie and Television Review and Classification Board in the same year.

She again was voted to the Provincial Board and served for consecutive terms in 2004, 2007, and 2010.

Acting Vice Governor 
Upon the death of Gregorio Sanchez, Jr. due to lung cancer on April 29, 2011, she was sworn as Vice Governor of the province of Cebu on May 10, 2011 to serve the remaining unfinished term of Sanchez. An electoral protest before the Commission on Election was ongoing against Sanchez filed by businessman Glenn Soco, thus her seat at the Sangguniang Panlalawigan remained vacant in the case that the protest would be decided in favor of Soco. Her assumption to the post was by virtue of her being the member of the Provincial Board who garnered the highest number of votes in the 2010 election.

On February 12, 2018, the Ombudsman ruled to dismiss then Gwendolyn Garcia based on the complaint Magpale filed in 2012 over the back-filling in the Balili property, a portion of which was submerged underwater. However, the ruling was overturned by the Court of Appeals on May 12, 2019.

Acting Governor 
She took oath as the acting governor when Garcia was suspended for six months on December 19, 2012. Garcia's suspension, which was signed by Executive Secretary Paquito Ochoa Jr. on behalf of President Benigno Aquino III, stemmed from the administrative complaint filed by Gregorio Sanchez Jr. in 2010 in connection with hiring of contractual workers. Garcia filed a temporary restraining order at the Court of Appeals, stating that she had acted within the bounds of her office's authority, and stayed in the Cebu Provincial Capitol until January 30, 2013, while Magpale began her term as acting governor in the Legislative Building.

Vice Governor 
Magpale ran for the position of Vice Governor under the Liberal Party and won in 2013 and was reelected for a second term in 2016.

On October 17, 2018, she filed her certificate of candidacy for Governor under the Nationalist People's Coalition for the 2019 mid-term election. On December 20, 2018, Congresswoman Gwendolyn Garcia of Cebu's 3rd district filed charges at the Office of the Ombudsman against Hilario Davide III, Agnes Magpale, and four Capitol officers on alleged appointments on positions that were "not yet to be declared vacant". Davide stated that the concerned appointments were in conformance to standard procedure.

On March 26, 2019, Garcia together with Provincial Board Member Alex Binghay also filed an injunction against Davide, Magpale, several Capitol officials, contractor WT Construction Inc. and Development Bank of the Philippines from constructing the ₱1.5 billion, 20-story Cebu Provincial Resource Center. Garcia alleged that contract for the building's construction was not authorized by the Provincial Board, while Davide claimed they complied the requisite protocols in pursuing the project.

Magpale was defeated by Gwendolyn Garcia of PDP–Laban, and Garcia returned as the elected Governor of Cebu in 2019.

Net worth 
According to the 2018 statements of assets, liabilities and net worth, she was the richest elected official in Cebu province with personal properties amounting to ₱44.83 million. She served as the president of Northeastern Cebu Colleges, a family-owned enterprise, and had financial interests with JD Almendras Agro Industrial Development Corporation. Both businesses were located in Danao.

Personal life 
She married Arsenio J. Magpale, Associate Justice of the Court of Appeals, who died on April 4, 2010. The couple had three children: Josefina Patricia, Jose Paolo, and Miguel Antonio.

Awards 
 Zonta Leadership
 Garbo sa Danao
 Ten Outstanding Cebuano UP Alumni Award
 Cebuano Heritage Award
 St. Theresa's College Achievers' Award
 888 New Forum Award as chair of the committee on tourism and international affairs of the Provincial Board
 2016 The Outstanding Cebuano Award

References 

Members of the Cebu Provincial Board
Governors of Cebu
Liberal Party (Philippines) politicians
Vice Governors of Cebu
Presidents of universities and colleges in the Philippines
University of the Philippines alumni
University of Santo Tomas alumni
1942 births
Living people